Shooting competitions at the 2008 Summer Olympics in Beijing were held from August 9 to August 17, at the Beijing Shooting Range Hall (rifle and pistol events) and Beijing Shooting Range Clay Target Field (shotgun events). Of the fifteen events, the host country won five.

Highlights included:
 Two rifle shooters, Czech Kateřina Kůrková and American Matthew Emmons, who met at the 2004 Olympics, married in 2007 and returned to the 2008 Games to win a gold and two silver medals between them. 
Kateřina Emmons equalled the world record with a perfect 400 in the women's air rifle competition. 
Matthew lost a large lead in the last shot of the men's three positions - just as he had in Athens four years earlier.
 Abhinav Bindra won India's first ever individual Olympic gold.
 Russian Natalia Paderina and Georgian Nino Salukvadze, whose countries were at war, won silver and bronze respectively in the 10m Air Pistol. They shared hugged and shook hands on the podium, which was seen as peaceful gesture. 
 The eighth appearance at the Olympics for Latvian Afanasijs Kuzmins 
 The seventh Olympic appearance for Slovenian Rajmond Debevec (who won bronze), making him only the fifth shooter to have ever competed in at least seven Olympic Games.
 The sixth Olympic appearance for eight shooters, raising to 22 the number of shooters who have competed in at least six Olympic Games:
Canadian Dr Susan Nattrass
Finn Juha Hirvi, 
Italian Andrea Benelli
German Ralf Schumann, who won his fifth Olympic medal.
Bulgarian Tanyu Kiryakov
Monegasque Fabienne Diato-Pasetti, 
Serbian Jasna Šekarić (competing under her fourth flag at the Olympics without ever having changed nationality),  
Georgian Nino Salukvadze. She won bronze, completing the set twenty years after she won gold and silver at the 1988 Olympics.
 The fifth Olympic appearance for 16 shooters, raising to 80 the number of shooters who have competed in at least five Olympic Games: Mönkhbayar Dorjsurengiin, Svetlana Demina, María Pilar Fernández, Mariya Grozdeva, Michael Diamond, Franck Dumoulin, Thomas Farnik, Andrei Inešin, Harald Jensen, Kanstantsin Lukashyk, Russell Mark, Sergey Martynov, Giovanni Pellielo, Stevan Pletikošić, Iulian Raicea, Axel Wegner.

The sport also faced its first major doping case, when Kim Jong-su of North Korea was stripped of his medals in 50 metre pistol and 10 metre air pistol after testing positive for propranolol, a beta blocker that some performers use to reduce stage fright and some surgeons use to reduce hand tremors during operations.

Events 
15 sets of medals were awarded in the following events:

A NOC may enter up to two athletes in all events except women's trap and skeet events where it can enter only one athlete. Only athletes who achieve the Minimum Qualification Score (MQS) can participate at the Olympics. One athlete can achieve only one quota place for his/her NOC in any event. If a quota place is won in a qualification event by a shooter who has already won a quota place in any event, the quota place will be granted to the NOC of the next ranking shooter.

Qualification 

Quota places are as follows:

*Note - there will also be 10 invitation and 14 universality quota places

Event schedule
All times are China Standard Time (UTC+8)

Saturday, August 9, 2008

Sunday, August 10, 2008

Monday, August 11, 2008

Tuesday, August 12, 2008

Wednesday, August 13, 2008

Thursday, August 14, 2008

Friday, August 15, 2008

Saturday, August 16, 2008

Sunday, August 17, 2008

Medal summary

Medal table

Men's events

Kim Jong-su of North Korea originally won the silver medal in the 50 metre pistol and bronze in the 10 metre air pistol, but was disqualified after he tested positive for propranolol.

Women's events

New records

See also 
Shooting at the 2008 Summer Paralympics

References

External links

International Shooting Sport Federation
Shooting – Official Results Book

 
2008 Summer Olympics events
2008
Olympics
Shooting competitions in China